Terry Schrunk Plaza is a park located in downtown Portland, Oregon, United States.

Description and history

Located across from City Hall, the park is named after former Portland mayor Terry Schrunk and neighbors the Plaza Blocks consisting of Chapman Square and Lownsdale Square. The park is not a city park, but instead owned by the federal government. Schrunk Plaza is across Third Avenue from the Edith Green – Wendell Wyatt Federal Building, and the plaza covers an underground parking structure for that building. That structure was the planned assassination site of Charles H. Turner in the failed plot by members of the Rajneeshees in 1985 to kill Turner, the U.S. Attorney for Oregon who worked in the building. There are several Taihu stones in the plaza which is a gift from Portland's Chinese sister city, Suzhou in 1996.

References

External links

Parks in Portland, Oregon
Southwest Portland, Oregon